In geometry, the truncated infinite-order square tiling is a uniform tiling of the hyperbolic plane. It has Schläfli symbol of t{4,∞}.

Uniform color
In (*∞44) symmetry this tiling has 3 colors. Bisecting the isosceles triangle domains can double the symmetry to *∞42 symmetry.

Symmetry 
The dual of the tiling represents the fundamental domains of (*∞44) orbifold symmetry. From [(∞,4,4)] (*∞44) symmetry, there are 15 small index subgroup (11 unique) by mirror removal and alternation operators. Mirrors can be removed if its branch orders are all even, and cuts neighboring branch orders in half. Removing two mirrors leaves a half-order gyration point where the removed mirrors met. In these images fundamental domains are alternately colored black and white, and mirrors exist on the boundaries between colors. The symmetry can be doubled to *∞42 by adding a bisecting mirror across the fundamental domains. The subgroup index-8 group, [(1+,∞,1+,4,1+,4)] (∞22∞22) is the commutator subgroup of [(∞,4,4)].

Related polyhedra and tiling

See also

Uniform tilings in hyperbolic plane
List of regular polytopes

References
 John H. Conway, Heidi Burgiel, Chaim Goodman-Strass, The Symmetries of Things 2008,  (Chapter 19, The Hyperbolic Archimedean Tessellations)

External links 

 Hyperbolic and Spherical Tiling Gallery

Hyperbolic tilings
Infinite-order tilings
Isogonal tilings
Square tilings
Truncated tilings
Uniform tilings